Uddika Premarathna (born 16 September 1980; උද්දික ප්‍රේමරත්න) is an actor in Sri Lankan cinema and television. Apart from acting, he is also a singer, TV announcer and a member of parliament.

Personal life
He is married to Anusha Kumari Pannala and the couple has one son, Angsh Prachien who was born on 24 April 2013.

Career
Uddika made his maiden cinema appearance with 2011 film Buddhist film Mahindagamanaya with a minor role. Then in 2013, he came to prominence with main role in the film Samanala Sandhawaniya with the role "Vadisha Wikramanayaka". The film successfully completed 100 days in theaters.

He was nominated for 'Most Popular Actor' at the 2014 Hiru Golden Film Awards. Then he won 'Best Actor' at the 2014 Sumathi Awards for his performance in short period of time.

In 2015, he was cast for the role "King Dutugemunu" for the blockbuster film Maharaja Gemunu directed by Jayantha Chandrasiri. The film awarded Most Popular Movie at 2016 Hiru Golden Film Awards. In 2017, Uddika acted in two films, Aloko Udapadi and Paha Samath. He played the main role of "King Walagamba" in the epic historical film Aloko Udapadi which was critically acclaimed. In the children's film Paha Samath, Uddika played the role of crippled father of Samath.

In 2019, Uddika acted in the thriller action film Rush with the lead character "Rashan 'Rush' Wijemanna". He described the role as a completely different one where he was previously acted in many kings roles.

In 2020, a series of drama and performing workshops were organized by the 'Ape Maga' Foundation led by Uddika was held on the 5th and 6th at the North Central Provincial Auditorium, Anuradhapura.

Selected television serials

 Ahimi as Saman 
 Alupaata Heena
 Bonda Meedum as Senaka
 Eka Gei Minissu as Jagdish
 Fengshui Gedara as Nissanka
 Girikula
 Hadawila Arana as Sithum Sooriyabandara
 Hansa Pihatu 
 Hopalu Arana as Thug
 Kalu Araliya as Wasantha
 Kapsuwahaskal As Valenta
 Me Suramya Paradisaya as Mahathun
 Mini Gan Dela as Aranolis
 Muthu Palasa
 Paara Dige as Rehan Aluvihare
 Renagala Walawwa as Malan 
 See Raja as Kashyapa 
 Sihinayaki Jeewithe
 Sillara Kasi as Niketha
 Sneha as Adithya 
 Yasa Isuru

Political career
In 2020, he was announced as a candidate for 2020 Sri Lankan parliamentary election contested from Anuradhapura district from Sri Lanka Podujana Peramuna. He won the election with 133,550 votes and won a seat in the 16th parliament.

Electoral history

Filmography

Songs
 Adare Kalath
 Nethu Addara Hinahenne
 Mage Wela Mage

Awards

OCIC Awards

|-
|| 2016 ||| Samanala Sandhawaniya || Best Actor ||

Sumathi Awards

|-
|| 2019 ||| Minigandela || Best Actor || 
|-
|| 2023 ||| People's vote || Most Popular Actor ||

References

External links
 
 Rush Over to Watch Rush
 පහරේ සැර
 සුපිරි තරුව රන්ජන් මතු දකින තරු 10 ක් ගැන කියයි
 සදේශ්ගේ අලුත් චිත්‍රපටය දිගටම වැඩ

1980 births
Sri Lankan male film actors
Sinhalese male actors
Living people
People from Anuradhapura
20th-century Sri Lankan male actors
Sri Lankan male television actors
Sri Lankan Buddhists